EPA Images | European Pressphoto Agency B.V. (EPA Images) is an international news photo agency.

Images from all parts of the world covering news, politics, sports, business, finance as well as arts, culture and entertainment are provided by a global network of over 400 professional photographers and included in the EPA Images service. The EPA Images picture and video service is based both on the broad network of EPA's staff photographers all over the world and on the daily production of its member agencies, which are all market leaders in their respective countries. All photos are edited and distributed to clients and partners worldwide by the editorial headquarters in Frankfurt am Main, Germany, which is staffed 24 hours daily.

The EPA Images service 
EPA built up a reputation for reliable, independent and unique photo coverage.

The international picture service of epa is used by diverse media as well as EPA's partners and shareholders worldwide. At present epa's editorial service offers approximately 2,200 new images on an average day.

The service includes photographs in the areas of news, sports, arts, culture and entertainment, economy, human interest, and science.

The EPA Images archive 
The epa photo archive dates back to 1997 and has over ten million images on stock, the majority of which can be accessed online.

History 
EPA Images was founded in 1985 by seven European news agencies. The agencies, AFP of France, ANP of the Netherlands, ANOP (now Lusa) of Portugal, ANSA of Italy, Belga of Belgium, dpa of Germany and EFE of Spain were motivated by what they saw as a lack of alternatives to the Anglo-Saxon picture services offered at the time.

Originally conceived as a vehicle to exchange pictures of the member agencies' domestic service; it also included the world service of AFP and other European services and suppliers. It expanded to a more independent entity as Eastern Europe opened up. The opening of these new markets, along with the war in the former Yugoslavia, led epa to employ its own photographers in those regions. Despite these developments, epa remained under the auspices of their member/owners whom it exclusively served.

EPA shareholders and EPA going global 
By 1995 EPA Images had ten members with the additions of Keystone later in 1985, APA of Austria in 1986, and Lehtikuva of Finland in 1987. Pressensbild of Sweden joined in 1997 followed by Scanfoto (later Scanpix Norway) of Norway and Nordfoto (later Scanpix Denmark) of Denmark in 1999. pap of Poland joined epa in 2001.

In early 2003 after extensive restructuring and the departure of AFP, epa successfully made its service available to the worldwide market. Later in 2003 Lehtikuva, Scanpix Denmark/Norway and Pressensbild (later Scanpix Sweden) decided not to continue as a shareholder of epa. However, Scanpix Norway, Sweden and Denmark continued cooperation with epa under the name of Scanpix Scandinavia.

ANA of Greece (now ANA-MPA) joined epa as a shareholder in 2004 followed by mti of Hungary in 2005.

Today epa has nine shareholders, all being market leaders in their respective countries:

 Athens News Agency-Macedonian Press Agency (ANA-MPA) in Greece
 Algemeen Nederlands Persbureau (ANP) in the Netherlands
 Agenzia Nazionale Stampa Associata (ANSA) in Italy
 Austria Presse Agentur (APA) in Austria
 Agencia EFE in Spain
 Keystone in Switzerland
 Lusa – Agência de Notícias de Portugal in Portugal
 Magyar Távirati Iroda (mti) in Hungary
 Polska Agencja Prasowa (pap) in Poland

Photojournalists 
Lucas Dolega, an EPA Images photojournalist, was the first journalist to have been killed during the 2010-2011 Tunisian protests and the first journalist to have died during the Arab Spring uprisings.

See also
Associated Press
Reuters
Agence France-Presse
Getty Images

References

External links 
 EPA Images
 Athens News Agency-Macedonian Press Agency (ANA-MPA) 
 Algemeen Nederlands Persbureau (ANP)
 Agenzia Nazionale Stampa Associata (ANSA) 
 Austria Presse Agentur (APA)
 Agencia EFE 
 Keystone
 Lusa 
 Magyar Távirati Iroda (mti) 
 Polska Agencja Prasowa (pap)

Companies based in Frankfurt
Mass media in Frankfurt
News agencies based in Germany
Mass media companies established in 1985
1985 establishments in West Germany

Photo archives in Germany
Photography companies of Germany
Photo agencies
Stock photography